Sacculina is a genus of barnacles that is a parasitic castrator of crabs. They belong to a group called Rhizocephala. The adults bear no resemblance to the barnacles that cover ships and piers; they are recognised as barnacles because their larval forms are like other members of the barnacle class Cirripedia. The prevalence of this crustacean parasite in its crab host can be as high as 50%.

Habitat
Sacculina live in a marine environment. During their larval stage they are  pelagic, but as they form into adults they live as ectoparasites on crabs. Their primary host is the green crab, which is native to the Eastern Atlantic Ocean. Though these crabs have spread to other bodies of waters, it is not believed that Sacculina barnacles have traveled with them to these new localities.

Anatomy
The body of the adult parasite can be divided into two parts: one part is called the "externa" where the bulbous reproductive organ of the parasite sticks out of the abdomen of the host. The other part is called the "interna" which is inside the host's body. This part is composed of root-like tendrils that wrap themselves around the host's organs, which gives its group name of Rhizocephala, meaning "root-head". Through microCT scans, these roots have been discovered to wrap around certain organs of the body, with most around the hepatopancreas of crustaceans. This area is primarily for absorbing nutrients, which would explain why most concentrate in that region. In a similar species called Briarosaccus roots were seen extending to the brain and central nervous system, which could help explain how parasites like these can manipulate their hosts' behavior.

Life cycle

The female Sacculina larva finds a crab and walks on it until she finds a joint. She then molts into a form called a kentrogon, which then injects her soft body into the crab while her shell falls off. The Sacculina grows in the crab, emerging as a sac, known as an externa, on the underside of the crab's rear thorax, where the crab's eggs would be incubated. Parasitic Sacculina destroy a crab's genitalia, rendering the crab permanently infertile.

After this invasion of the Sacculina, the crab is unable to perform the normal function of molting. This results in a loss of nutrition for the crab, and impairs its overall growth. The natural ability of regrowing a severed claw that is commonly used for defense purposes is therefore lost after the infestation of Sacculina.

The male Sacculina 'larva' looks for a female Sacculina  on the underside of a crab. He then implants his cells into a pocket in the female's body called the "testis", where the male cells then produce spermatozoa to fertilize eggs. 

When a female Sacculina is implanted in a male crab, it interferes with the crab's hormonal balance. This sterilizes it and changes the bodily layout of the crab to resemble that of a female crab by widening and flattening its abdomen, among other things. The female Sacculina then forces the crab's body to release hormones, causing it to act like a female crab, even to the point of performing female mating dances. If the parasite is removed from the host, female crabs will normally regenerate new ovarian tissue, while males usually develop complete or partial ovaries instead of testes.

Although all energy otherwise expended on reproduction is directed to the Sacculina, the crab develops a nurturing behavior typical of a normal female crab. The natural hatching process of a crab consists of the female finding a high rock and grooming its brood pouch on its abdomen and releasing the fertilized eggs in the water through a bobbing motion. The female crab stirs the water with her claw to aid the flow of the water. When the hatching larvae of Sacculina are ready to emerge from the brood pouch of female Sacculina, the crab performs a similar process. The crab shoots them out in pulses, creating a large cloud of Sacculina larvae. The crab uses the familiar technique of stirring the water to aid in flow.

Life span
Sacculina are primarily host dependent so their life span matches that of their hosts. Crabs usually have a life span anywhere from 1 to 2 years.

Biological control agents  
Sacculina has been suggested to be used as a type of biological control agent to help reduce the populations of the invasive green crab. This is controversial because Sacculina can also use native crab species as their host.

Species
More than 100 species of Sacculina are currently recognised:

 Sacculina abyssicola 
 Sacculina actaeae 
 Sacculina aculeata Boschma, 1928
 Sacculina ales Kossmann, 1872
 Sacculina americana Reinhard, 1955
 Sacculina amplituba Phillips, 1978
 Sacculina anceps Boschma, 1931
 Sacculina angulata 
 Sacculina anomala Boschma, 1933
 Sacculina atlantica Boschma, 1927
 Sacculina beauforti Boschma, 1949
 Sacculina bicuspidata Boschma, 1931
 Sacculina bipunctata Kossmann, 1872
 Sacculina boschmai Reinhard, 1955
 Sacculina bourdoni Boschma, 1960
 Sacculina brevispina 
 Sacculina bucculenta Boschma, 1933
 Sacculina bursapastoris Kossmann, 1872
 Sacculina caelata Boschma, 1931
 Sacculina calappae 
 Sacculina calva Boschma, 1933
 Sacculina captiva Kossmann, 1872
 Sacculina carcini Thompson, 1836
 Sacculina carpiliae 
 Sacculina cartieri Kossmann, 1872
 Sacculina cavolinii Kossmann, 1872
 Sacculina comosa Boschma, 1931
 Sacculina compressa Boschma, 1931
 Sacculina confragosa Boschma, 1933
 Sacculina cordata Shiino, 1943
 Sacculina crucifera Kossmann, 1872
 Sacculina curvata Boschma, 1933
 Sacculina cuspidata Boschma, 1949
 Sacculina dayi Boschma, 1958
 Sacculina dentata Kossmann, 1872
 Sacculina docleae Huang & Lützen, 1998
 Sacculina duracina Boschma, 1933
 Sacculina echinulata 
 Sacculina elongata Boschma, 1933
 Sacculina eriphiae Smith, 1906
 Sacculina exarcuata Kossmann, 1872
 Sacculina fabacea Shiino, 1943
 Sacculina flacca Boschma, 1931
 Sacculina flexuosa Kossmann, 1872
 Sacculina gerbei 
 Sacculina ghanensis Boschma, 1971
 Sacculina gibba Boschma, 1933
 Sacculina glabra 
 Sacculina globularis Boschma, 1970
 Sacculina gonoplaxae 
 Sacculina gordonae Boschma, 1933
 Sacculina gracilis Boschma, 1931
 Sacculina granifera Boschma, 1973
 Sacculina granulosa Boschma, 1931
 Sacculina guineensis Boschma, 1971
 Sacculina hartnolli Boschma, 1965
 Sacculina herbstianodosa (Hesse, 1867)
 Sacculina hirsuta Boschma, 1925
 Sacculina hirta Boschma, 1933
 Sacculina hispida Boschma, 1928
 Sacculina holthuisi Boschma, 1956
 Sacculina hystrix 
 Sacculina ignorata Boschma, 1947
 Sacculina imberbis Shiino, 1943
 Sacculina inconstans Boschma, 1952
 Sacculina infirma Boschma, 1953
 Sacculina inflata Leuckart, 1859
 Sacculina insueta Boschma, 1966
 Sacculina irrorata Boschma, 1934
 Sacculina jamaicensis Boschma, 1966
 Sacculina lata Boschma, 1933
 Sacculina leopoldi Boschma, 1931
 Sacculina leptothrix Boschma, 1933
 Sacculina lobata Boschma, 1965
 Sacculina loricata 
 Sacculina margaritifera Kossmann, 1872
 Sacculina micracantha Boschma, 1931
 Sacculina microthrix Boschma, 1931
 Sacculina muricata Boschma, 1931
 Sacculina nectocarcini 
 Sacculina nigra Shiino, 1943
 Sacculina nodosa Boschma, 1931
 Sacculina ornatula Boschma, 1951
 Sacculina ostracotheris Boschma, 1967
 Sacculina papposa 
 Sacculina pertenuis Boschma, 1933
 Sacculina phacelothrix Boschma, 1931
 Sacculina pilosa Kossmann, 1872
 Sacculina pilosella 
 Sacculina pinnotherae Shiino, 1943
 Sacculina pisiformis Kossmann, 1872
 Sacculina pistillata Boschma, 1952
 Sacculina pomum Kossmann, 1872
 Sacculina pugettiae Shiino, 1943
 Sacculina pulchella Boschma, 1933
 Sacculina punctata Boschma, 1934
 Sacculina pustulata Boschma, 1925
 Sacculina quadrialata Boyko & van der Meij, 2018
 Sacculina rathbunae Boschma, 1933
 Sacculina reinhardi 
 Sacculina reniformis Boschma, 1933
 Sacculina robusta Boschma, 1948
 Sacculina rotundata Miers, 1880
 Sacculina rugosa 
 Sacculina scabra Boschma, 1931
 Sacculina schmitti Boschma, 1933
 Sacculina scutigera Huang & Lützen, 1998
 Sacculina semistriata 
 Sacculina senta Boschma, 1933
 Sacculina serenei Boschma, 1954
 Sacculina setosa 
 Sacculina spectabilis Boschma, 1948
 Sacculina spinosa 
 Sacculina striata Boschma, 1931
 Sacculina sulcata 
 Sacculina surinamensis Boschma, 1966
 Sacculina teres Boschma, 1933
 Sacculina teretiuscula Boschma, 1931
 Sacculina ternatensis Boschma, 1950
 Sacculina upogebiae Shiino, 1943
 Sacculina vankampeni Boschma, 1931
 Sacculina verrucosa 
 Sacculina vieta Boschma, 1933
 Sacculina weberi Boschma, 1931
 Sacculina zariquieyi Boschma, 1947

References

Sources
 
 (cites many earlier papers by Boschma and others including other sources for the above list)

External links

 

Barnacles
Parasitic crustaceans
Parasites of crustaceans
Mind-altering parasites
Crustacean genera